STEVE ("Strong Thermal Emission Velocity Enhancement") is an atmospheric optical phenomenon that appears as a purple and green light ribbon in the sky, named in late 2016 by aurora watchers from Alberta, Canada. The phenomenon is not rare, but had not been investigated and described scientifically prior to that time.

Discovery and naming 
The STEVE phenomenon has been observed by auroral photographers for decades. Some evidence to suggests that observations of it may have been recorded as early as 1705. Notations resembling the phenomenon exist in some observations by Carl Størmer.

The first accurate determination of the nature of the phenomenon was not made, however, until after members of a Facebook group, Alberta Aurora Chasers, named it, attributed it to a proton aurora, and began calling it a "proton arc". When physics professor Eric Donovan from the University of Calgary saw their photographs and suspected that their determination was incorrect because proton auroras are not visible, he correlated the time and location of the phenomenon with Swarm satellite data and one of the Alberta Aurora Chaser photographers, Song Despins. She provided GPS coordinates from Vimy, Alberta, that helped Donovan link the data to identify the phenomenon.

One of the aurora watchers, photographer Chris Ratzlaff, suggested using the name "Steve" for the phenomenon, deriving from a situation occurring in Over the Hedge, an animated comedy movie from 2006. The characters in the movie give the name to a hedge that appears overnight, in order to make it seem more benign. Reports of the heretofore undescribed and unusual "aurora" went viral as an example of citizen science on Aurorasaurus.

During the fall meeting of the American Geophysical Union in December 2016, Robert Lysak suggested using a backronym of "Steve" for the phenomenon that would stand for a "Strong Thermal Emission Velocity Enhancement". That acronym, "STEVE", has been adopted by the team at NASA Goddard Space Flight Center that is studying the phenomenon.

Occurrence and cause 
STEVE phenomena may be spotted closer to the equator than the aurora, and as of March 2018, have been observed in the United Kingdom, Canada, Alaska, northern U.S. states, and New Zealand. the phenomenon appears as a very narrow arc extending for hundreds or thousands of miles, aligned east–west. It generally lasts for twenty minutes to an hour. As of March 2018, STEVE phenomena have only been spotted in the presence of an aurora. None were observed from October 2016 to February 2017, or from October 2017 to February 2018, leading NASA to believe that STEVE phenomena may only appear during certain seasons.

A study published in March 2018 by Elizabeth A. MacDonald and co-authors in the peer-reviewed journal, Science Advances, suggested that the STEVE phenomenon accompanies a subauroral ion drift (SAID), a fast-moving stream of extremely hot particles. STEVE marks the first observed visual effect accompanying a SAID.

In August 2018, researchers determined that the skyglow of the phenomenon was not associated with particle precipitation (electrons or ions) and, as a result, could be generated in the ionosphere.

Association with picket-fence aurora
Often, although not always, a STEVE phenomenon is observed above a green, "picket-fence" aurora according to a study published in Geophysical Research Letters.

 Although the picket-fence aurora is created through precipitation of electrons, they appear outside the auroral oval and so their formation is different from traditional aurora. The study also showed these phenomena appear in both hemispheres simultaneously. Sightings of picket-fence aurora have been made without observations of STEVE.

The green emissions in the picket fence aurora seem to be related to eddies in the supersonic flow of charged particles, similar to the eddies seen in a river that move more slowly than the water around them. Hence, the green bars in the picket fence are moving more slowly than the structures in the purple emissions and some scientists have speculated they could be caused by turbulence in the charged particles from space.

Research

2017 
 "How I met Steve" - Eric Donovan's presentation to the 2017 ESA Earth Explorer Missions Science Meeting, March 20, 2017 (1:08:30 - 1:26:00) 
 "On the location of Steve, the mysterious subauroral feature"

2018 
 "New Science in Plain Sight: Citizen scientists lead to the discovery of optical structure in the upper atmosphere" 
 "On the Origin of STEVE: Particle Precipitation or Ionospheric Skyglow?" 
 "Historical observations of STEVE" 
 "What else can citizen science and 'amateur' observations reveal about STEVE?" 
 "From the spark to the fire, reflections on five years of public participation in aurora research" 
 "On the origin and geomagnetic conditions of STEVE's formation" 
 "A Statistical Analysis of STEVE"

2019 
 "How Did We Miss This? An Upper Atmospheric Discovery Named STEVE" 
 "First Observations From the TREx Spectrograph: The Optical Spectrum of STEVE and the Picket Fence Phenomena" 
 "Color Ratios of Subauroral (STEVE) Arcs" 
 "A new dataset of STEVE phenomenon related observations spanning multiple solar cycles" 
 "Subauroral Green STEVE Arcs: Evidence for Low-Energy Excitation" 
 "Magnetospheric Signatures of STEVE: Implications for the Magnetospheric Energy Source and Interhemispheric Conjugacy" 
 "High-Latitude Ionospheric Electrodynamics Characterizing Energy and Momentum Deposition during STEVE Events Reported by Citizen Scientists" 
 "Steve: The Optical Signature of Intense Subauroral Ion Drifts" 
 "Optical Spectra and Emission Altitudes of Double-Layer STEVE: A Case Study" 
 "The Vertical Distribution of the Optical Emissions of a Steve and Picket Fence Event" 
 "Identifying STEVE's Magnetospheric Driver Using Conjugate Observations in the Magnetosphere and on the Ground" 
 "STEVE and the Picket Fence: Evidence of Feedback-Unstable Magnetosphere-Ionosphere Interaction" 
 "Possible Evidence of STEVE in Dynamics Explorer-2 Data"

2020 
 "Early Ground-Based Work by Auroral Pioneer Carl Størmer on the High-Altitude Detached Subauroral Arcs Now Known as “STEVE”" 
 "Early Evidence of Isolated Auroral Structures in the 100 km Height Regime Observed at Subauroral Latitudes by the Aurora Pioneer Carl Størmer" 
 "Early Ground-Based Work by Auroral Pioneer Carl Størmer on the High-Altitude Detached Subauroral Arcs Now Known as “STEVE”" 
 "Magnetospheric Conditions for STEVE and SAID: Particle Injection, Substorm Surge, and Field-Aligned Currents" 
 "Neutral Wind Dynamics Preceding the STEVE Occurrence and Their Possible Preconditioning Role in STEVE Formation" 
 "A Mechanism for the STEVE Continuum Emission" 
 "High-latitude Ionospheric Electrodynamics during STEVE Events" 
 "Dynamics of Auroral Precipitation Boundaries Associated With STEVE and SAID" 
 "The Apparent Motion of STEVE and the Picket Fence Phenomena" 
 "Characteristics of fragmented aurora-like emissions (FAEs) observed on Svalbard" 
 "Fragmented Aurora-like Emissions (FAEs) as a new type of aurora-like phenomenon"

2021 
 "Multi-Wavelength Imaging Observations of STEVE at Athabasca, Canada" 
 "Registration of synchronous geomagnetic pulsations and proton aurora during the substorm on March 1, 2017" 
 "First Simultaneous Observation of STEVE and SAR Arc Combining Data From Citizen Scientists, 630.0 nm All-Sky Images, and Satellites" 
 "Proton Aurora and Optical Emissions in the Subauroral Region" 
 "Robust techniques to improve high quality triangulations of contemporaneous citizen science observations of STEVE" 
 "Comparison of the SAR arc, STEVE and Picket fence dynamics registered at the Maimaga subauroral station on March 1, 2017" 
 "Improved Analysis of STEVE Photographs"

2022 
 "Rainbow of the Night: First Direct Observation of a SAR arc evolving into STEVE" 
 "Auroral structures: Revealing the importance of meso-scale M-I coupling"

See also 
 Space weather
 Thermosphere
 Solar prominence
 Upper-atmospheric lightning
 Atypical auroras

References

External links 

 Eric Donovan's presentation at 2017 ESA Earth Explorer Missions Science Meeting (1:08:30 - 1:26:00)
 Alberta Aurora Chasers
 
 STEVE over Copper Harbor May 5, 2021

Atmospheric optical phenomena
Earth phenomena
Electrical phenomena
Light sources
Plasma physics
Planetary science
Space plasmas
Citizen science